Matthias Menck (also known as Double M or Toxilogic) is a German audio engineer, house and trance producer and DJ. A resident of Hamburg, he is most famous for being a part of Brooklyn Bounce.

Producer and DJ 
Matthias Menck has been part of the international electronic music scene since the 1980s. As producer and DJ he helped to establish House Music in Hamburg. Whilst he was a young graduate audio engineer, he spent many sleepless nights in the recording studio and in the legendary Kontor Club where he was resident DJ. His first Gold and Platinum Record status he achieved with Brooklyn Bounce, one of his early commercial projects.In later years, as his musical career developed and inspired by his many international DJ gigs, Matthias has moved away from commercial sounds and has gone back to his roots. Which lie unmistakably in the House music. Matthias' productions and DJ sets authentically capture his musical history and stand out both musically and technically.
Aside from his solo projects (e.g. on Ministry of Sound) and remixes (e.g. DJ Antoine, Chris Kaeser, D.o.n.s. ) Menck works regularly with various Artists like Christoph Brüx, Thomas Gold, Jerry Ropero or D.O.N.S. and very closely with Terri B.

Bands 
SMC Unity
Members: Sofie St. Claire, Matthias Menck, Christoph Brüx
Dolphin Sound
Members: Christoph Brüx, Matthias Menck
Brooklyn Bounce
Aliases: Abuna E, Beatbox, Boys-R-Us, Harmonic Beats, Mental Madness Productions
Members: Matthias Menck, Dennis Bohn
Terraformer
Members: Dennis Bohn & Mattias Menck, Jan Miesner, Heiko Lempio

Associated acts

External links 
 Official website
 Matthias Menck on discogs
 Matthias Menck biography on Myspace

References 

Living people
German audio engineers
German DJs
German record producers
German house musicians
German electronic musicians
German trance musicians
Musicians from Hamburg
Electronic dance music DJs
Year of birth missing (living people)
Engineers from Hamburg